General Manuel Belgrano is a department of Misiones Province (Argentina).

References 

Departments of Misiones Province